The Victorian Chamber of Commerce and Industry is the largest and most influential not-for-profit business organisation in Victoria, informing and supporting 47,000 members and clients across the state. 
Founded in 1851 with headquarters in Melbourne, the influential employer group is focused on leading business into the future by providing policy leadership, information, representation, training and networking opportunities.

As a major shareholder of the Australian Chamber of Commerce and Industry, the Victorian Chamber plays a critical role in policy development at both state and federal level. Campaigns centre on securing practical and direct gains for Victorian business in areas including workplace relations, taxation, regulation, infrastructure and skills.

With an annual turnover of $40 million, the Victorian Chamber employs around 220 staff across its Melbourne, Ballarat, Bendigo, Geelong, Wodonga and Traralgon offices.

History 
The Victorian Chamber was founded as the Melbourne Chamber of Commerce in 1851. It was Victoria’s first business organisation. The Chamber’s members – bankers, accountants, financiers, merchants, importers, lawyers, ship owners and agents, manufacturers and stock, share and product brokers – sought to advance trade and commerce and make Melbourne one of the world’s great free ports. It helped to establish the Melbourne Harbor Trust and Marine Board.

In October 1986, the Chamber changed its name to the State Chamber of Commerce and Industry (Victoria), which merged with the Victorian Employers’ Federation to become the Victorian Employers Chamber of Commerce and Industry (VECCI) in 1991, serving Victoria’s small and medium enterprises.

In November 2015, the Victorian Chamber underwent a rebrand and name change to the Victorian Chamber of Commerce and Industry, in line with rebrand of the Australian Chamber of Commerce and Industry, demonstrating a commitment to a common national purpose through a shared identity and voice.

In 2013, the Victorian Chamber re-established the Melbourne Chamber of Commerce, which specifically caters for Victoria’s leading corporations across all sectors of the economy.

Core divisions
 Policy and advocacy - including formal submissions to government arising from Policy Taskforces and quarterly member survey
 Industrial and workplace relations - including member helpline and representation at the Fair Work Commission
 Victorian Chamber of Commerce and Industry Apprenticeship Services - founding member of Apprenticeship Support Australia (2015) 
 Registered Training Organisation – including a range of nationally recognised qualifications and short courses
 Global Services- including trade documentation, import/export consultancy, Victoria-Jiangsu Business Placement Program and China e-Commerce Platform
 Membership Services - including Connect member benefits programs
 Events
 OHS consulting – including incident investigations and advice on Workers’ Compensation
 CCI Lawyers
 Melbourne Chamber of Commerce (MCC)

Key personnel
 President – Karyn Sobels was appointed President of the Victorian Chamber on 14 November 2019, following three years as Deputy President. Karyn has over 30 years’ experience in the Retail, Telecommunications and Banking sectors. Karyn is a Director of publishing company Riskinfo and of the Telstra Licensee Association, and Principal of business advisors SKS Hub Pty.
 Deputy President – Adrian Kloeden was appointed Deputy President of the Victorian Chamber on 14 November 2019. Adrian is a non-executive Director and currently serves as Chairman of Aquasure Holdings Pty Ltd and associated companies, Chairman of Hancock Victorian Plantations Holdings Pty Ltd and associated companies, and a Director of The Smith Family.
 Chief Executive – Paul Guerra was appointed Chief Executive of the Victorian Chamber in 2019, commencing in 2020. Paul is an internationally experienced leader having held Managing Director/CEO and Chairman level roles across Australia and Asia Pacific, spanning several key industries. Prior to joining the Victorian Chamber, Paul was the Chief Executive of the Royal Agricultural Society of Victoria (RASV). 
Chief Executive, Melbourne Chamber of Commerce – Scott Veenker joined the Victorian Chamber in 2016 after more than 20 years' experience in banking and finance, having held senior positions across multiple distribution channels with Esanda Finance and ANZ.

Past Publications 
 Business Excellence – quarterly Victorian Chamber and MCC member magazine
 Tourism Excellence – quarterly VTIC and VEIC member magazine
 Survey of Business Trends and Prospects – quarterly results booklet
 Latest policy papers: Strengthening the Competitiveness of Victoria's Higher Education Sector, Regional Victoria Means Business, Reforming the Victorian Vocational Education and Training System, Small Business. Big Opportunities

References

About the Victorian Chamber. Retrieved 12 November 2015.

External links
 Company site: http://www.victorianchamber.com.au

Organizations established in 1851
1851 establishments in Australia
Chambers of commerce in Australia
Economy of Victoria (Australia)